Jan Pivec (19 May 1907 – 10 May 1980), was a Czechoslovak film and stage actor. He appeared in more than 69 films between 1940 and 1973. He concurrently spent 36 years acting in productions staged by Prague's National Theatre. Books published in 1989, and in 2006, detailed his career.

Selected filmography
 Delightful Story (1936)
 Filosofská historie (1937)
 Pantáta Bezoušek (1941)
 The Blue Star Hotel (1941)
 Rozina, the Love Child (1945)
 Divá Bára (1949)
 Jan Hus (1954)
 Jan Žižka (1955)
 Against All (1956)
 Zločin a trik II.'' (1967)

References

External links
 

1907 births
1980 deaths
Czechoslovak male film actors
Czechoslovak male stage actors
Czech male silent film actors
20th-century Czech male actors